The Sony Alpha 68 or Sony ILCA-68(named internally; ILCA- although coming from the "Sony SLT camera" line of cameras) is a mid-size DSLT camera announced by Sony on November 5, 2015  and available for purchase starting April 2016 (US) and March 2016 (Europe). Sony markets it as having "4D FOCUS for fast, accurate tracking autofocus".

Camera packages named with additional letter K ship with the 18–55 mm and 18–135 mm Zoom Lens in a kit, similar to model/kit variants of the SLT-A58Y and SLT-A58K.

Specifications
24.2 MP APS-C Exmor CMOS sensor. "4D" focus system as introduced on the α77 II, Bionz X and more efficient XAVC S codec HD video encoding at a higher framerate (1080/30p vs. 1080/24p on previous models).
 ISO ranges from 100 to 12800 (in video) and 25600 (in still image mode). Video resolution is limited to 1080p60.

References

Full specs

68
Live-preview digital cameras
Cameras introduced in 2015